Not Quite Me is the second studio album by American singer/songwriter Tess Wiley, released in 2004.

Track listing
All songs by Tess Wiley, except where noted

"Not Quite Me" – 3:52
"How Does Silence Feel" – 3:28
"Let It Come" – 4:00
"Nature of the World" – 4:23
"Revelry" – 4:37
"Delicate Skin" – 4:04
"My Fortress and My Shield" – 4:37
"Falling In and Out" – 4:25
"Happy Now" – 5:00
"This Shadow" – 3:22

Personnel
 Tess Wiley - vocals, guitar
 Miriam - background vocals
 Christian - drums

References

2004 albums
Tess Wiley albums
Tapete Records albums